Tennis is one of the most popular sports in Germany with more than five million active players. The German Tennis Federation is the largest tennis federation in the world with ca. 1.4 million members.

All statistics below are based on the data from the ATP and the WTA in the Open Era (since 1968).

Active players are in boldface.

All lists are correct .

Highest ranked players 
HR = Highest ranking, CR = Current ranking  Players are sorted by highest ranking, then by number of titles.

Singles 
The lists include the 50 best ranked German players. The rankings were introduced in 1973 (men) and 1975 (women).

Men

Women

Doubles 
The lists include the 20 best ranked German players. The rankings were introduced in 1976 (men) and 1984 (women).

Men

Women

Singles achievements timeline 

Rankings before the first official rankings in 1973 (ATP) and 1975 (WTA) are estimated or per Lance Tingay (*). GS = Grand Slam

Best results at significant tournaments

Singles 
The lists include all German players who reached at least a quarterfinal at a Grand Slam, ATP/WTA Finals or Olympic tournament.

Men

Women

Doubles 
The lists include all German players who reached at least a final at a Grand Slam, ATP/WTA Finals or Olympic tournament.

Men

Women

Mixed

Records

Singles 
{|class="wikitable sortable nowrap"
! colspan="2" rowspan="2" style="border-right: 1pt black solid" | Record !! colspan="2" style="border-right: 1pt black solid" | Men !! colspan="2" | Women
|-
! width=135 | Player !! width=75 class="unsortable" style="border-right: 1pt black solid" | Record !! width=135 | Player !! width=75 class="unsortable" | Record
|- bgcolor=efefef style="border-top:2px solid gray"
| rowspan="13"| Titles (Finals)
| width=125 style="border-right: 1pt black solid" | Overall ||  || align="right" style="border-right: 1pt black solid" | 49 (77) || width=135 |  || align="right" | 107 (138) 
|- bgcolor=f3e6d7
| style="border-right: 1pt black solid" | Grand Slams ||  || align="right" style="border-right: 1pt black solid" | 6 (10) ||  || align="right" | 22 (31) 
|- bgcolor=ffffcc
| style="border-right: 1pt black solid" | Australian Open ||  || align="right" style="border-right: 1pt black solid" | 2 (2) ||  || align="right" | 4 (5) 
|- bgcolor=ebc2af
| style="border-right: 1pt black solid" | French Open || Michael Stich || align="right" style="border-right: 1pt black solid" | 0 (1) ||  || align="right" | 6 (9) 
|- bgcolor=ccffcc
| style="border-right: 1pt black solid" | Wimbledon ||  || align="right" style="border-right: 1pt black solid" | 3 (7) ||  || align="right" | 7 (9) 
|- bgcolor=ccccff
| style="border-right: 1pt black solid" | US Open ||  || align="right" style="border-right: 1pt black solid" | 1 (1) ||  || align="right" | 5 (8) 
|- bgcolor=ffff99
| style="border-right: 1pt black solid" | ATP / WTA Finals ||  || align="right" style="border-right: 1pt black solid" | 3 (8) ||  || align="right" | 5 (6) 
|- bgcolor=ffea5c
| style="border-right: 1pt black solid" | Olympics ||  || align="right" style="border-right: 1pt black solid" | 1 (1) ||  || align="right" | 1 (2) 
|- bgcolor=ecf2ff
| style="border-right: 1pt black solid" | Davis / Fed Cup || Kühnen, Steeb || align="right" style="border-right: 1pt black solid" | 3 (3)||  || align="right" | 2 (2)
|- bgcolor=ccccff
| style="border-right: 1pt black solid" | Hard ||  || align="right" style="border-right: 1pt black solid" | 16 (22) ||  || align="right" | 37 (50)
|- bgcolor=ebc2af
| style="border-right: 1pt black solid" | Clay ||  || align="right" style="border-right: 1pt black solid" | 6 (12) ||  || align="right" | 32 (43)
|- bgcolor=ccffcc
| style="border-right: 1pt black solid" | Grass ||  || align="right" style="border-right: 1pt black solid" | 7 (12) ||  || align="right" | 7 (9)
|- bgcolor=thistle
| style="border-right: 1pt black solid" | Carpet ||  || align="right" style="border-right: 1pt black solid" | 26 (37) ||  || align="right" | 31 (36)|- bgcolor=efefef style="border-top:2px solid gray"
| rowspan="13" | Matches won || bgcolor=efefef style="border-right: 1pt black solid" | Overall ||  || align="right" style="border-right: 1pt black solid" | 713 (927) ||  || align="right" | 885 (991) 
|- bgcolor=f3e6d7
| style="border-right: 1pt black solid" | Grand Slams ||  || align="right" style="border-right: 1pt black solid" | 163 (203) ||  || align="right" | 278 (310) 
|- bgcolor=ffffcc
| style="border-right: 1pt black solid" | Australian Open ||  || align="right" style="border-right: 1pt black solid" | 29 (38) ||  || align="right" | 47 (53) 
|- bgcolor=ebc2af
| style="border-right: 1pt black solid" | French Open ||  || align="right" style="border-right: 1pt black solid" | 26 (35) ||  || align="right" | 84 (94) 
|- bgcolor=ccffcc
| style="border-right: 1pt black solid" | Wimbledon ||  || align="right" style="border-right: 1pt black solid" | 71 (83) ||  || align="right" | 74 (81) 
|- bgcolor=ccccff
| style="border-right: 1pt black solid" | US Open ||  || align="right" style="border-right: 1pt black solid" | 37 (47) ||  || align="right" | 73 (82) 
|- bgcolor=ffff99
| style="border-right: 1pt black solid" | ATP / WTA Finals ||  || align="right" style="border-right: 1pt black solid" | 36 (49) ||  || align="right" | 33 (41) 
|- bgcolor=ffea5c
| style="border-right: 1pt black solid" | Olympics ||  || align="right" style="border-right: 1pt black solid" | 6 (8) ||  || align="right" | 10 (11) 
|- bgcolor=ecf2ff
| style="border-right: 1pt black solid" | Davis / Fed Cup ||  || align="right" style="border-right: 1pt black solid" | 38 (41)||  || align="right" | 24 (33)|- bgcolor=ccccff
| style="border-right: 1pt black solid" | Hard ||  || align="right" style="border-right: 1pt black solid" | 343 (535) ||  || align="right" | 343 (382)|- bgcolor=ebc2af
| style="border-right: 1pt black solid" | Clay ||  || align="right" style="border-right: 1pt black solid" | 178 (317) ||  || align="right" | 271 (301)|- bgcolor=ccffcc
| style="border-right: 1pt black solid" | Grass ||  || align="right" style="border-right: 1pt black solid" | 116 (141)||  || align="right" | 93 (139)|- bgcolor=thistle
| style="border-right: 1pt black solid" | Carpet ||  || align="right" style="border-right: 1pt black solid" | 258 (322) ||  || align="right" | 187 (210)|- bgcolor=efefef
| rowspan="2" style="border-top:2px solid gray" | Match win %
| style="border-right: 1pt black solid; border-top:2px solid gray" | Overall || style="border-top:2px solid gray" |  || align="right" style="border-right: 1pt black solid; border-top:2px solid gray" | 76.9% || style="border-top:2px solid gray" |  || align="right" style="border-top:2px solid gray" | 89.3%
|- bgcolor=f3e6d7
| style="border-right: 1pt black solid" | Grand Slams ||  || align="right" style="border-right: 1pt black solid" | 80.3% ||  || align="right" | 89.7%
|- bgcolor=efefef
| colspan="2" style="border-right: 1pt black solid; border-top:2px solid gray" | Grand Slam appearances || style="border-top:2px solid gray" |  || align="right" style="border-right: 1pt black solid; border-top:2px solid gray" | 68 || style="border-top:2px solid gray" |  || align="right" style="border-top:2px solid gray" | 58
|- bgcolor=efefef
| colspan="2" style="border-right: 1pt black solid" | Top 10 wins ||  || align="right" style="border-right: 1pt black solid" | 121 ||  || align="right" | 208
|- bgcolor=efefef
| colspan="2" style="border-right: 1pt black solid" | Youngest title winner ||  || align="right" style="border-right: 1pt black solid" | 17 yrs 6 m ||  || align="right" | 15 yrs 8 m
|- bgcolor=efefef
| colspan="2" style="border-right: 1pt black solid" | Oldest title winner ||  || align="right" style="border-right: 1pt black solid" | 35 yrs 6 m ||  || align="right" | 34 yrs 8 m
|}

 Doubles 

 Team competitions 

Finals

TimelineDavis Cup and Billie Jean King Cup (formerly Fed Cup) results since 1981''

See also
German Tennis Federation
Germany Davis Cup team
Germany Billie Jean King Cup team
Sport in Germany

Sources
 
 
 
 
 Further sources: ITF, Ultimate Tennis Statistics, Matchstat, Tennis Abstract, Tennis Forecast

References